Three ships of the Bank Line were named Hazelbank:

, wrecked in 1890
, in service 1945–57
, in service 1964–79

Ship names